La Neuville-lès-Bray (literally La Neuville near Bray) is a commune in the Somme department in Hauts-de-France in northern France.

Geography

Population

Places of interest
Froissy Dompierre Light Railway and museum at nearby Froissy.

See also
Froissy (La Neuville-lès-Bray) 
Communes of the Somme department

References

External links

 La Neuville-lès-Bray official website 

Communes of Somme (department)